The 1990 Campeonato Argentino de rugby  was won for the fourth consecutive year by the selection of Unión de Rugby de Tucumàn  that beat in the final the selection of Cuyo

Rugby Union in Argentina in 1990

National
 The Buenos Aires Champsionship was won by Alumni
 The Cordoba Province Championship was won by Tala
 The North-East Championship was won by Tucumán RC

International
 The England national rugby union team visited Argentina, seventeen year after the refuse of 1973 ( a tour was arranged but was last minute cancelled by  Rugby Football Union worried, about the political situation in Argentina. The series was tied (1-1). 
For the first time in his history, England accepted to play a match with a club and not against a provincial selection. The match is against Banco Nacion led Hugo Porta that obtained an historical victory.

 The remaining of the years for "Pumas" was a Nightmare, an internal loss against Canada, and a tour in British Isles with heavy losses against Scotland and Ireland. Hugo Porta came back for that occasion but was injured and leave the national team, and same month after spot to play rugby.

"Campeonato" Tournemanet 
The better eight teams played for title. They were divided in two pools of four, the first two each pools admitted to semifinals, the last relegated in secondo division

Pool A

Pool B

Semifinals

Third place final

Final 

Tucumán: 15. F. Williams, 14.G. Terán, 13.P. Gauna, 12.L. Herrera, 11.M. Terán, 10.R. Sauze, 9.P. Merlo (Cap.), 8.F. Buabse, 7.S. Bunader, 6.J.Santamarina, 5.H. Apas, 4,C. Gentile (Micheli 51'), 3.S. Paz Posse, 2.J. Paz (h), 1.L. Corla.
  Cuyo:15.F. Lola, 14.M. Roby, 13.C. Cipitelli (Cap.), 12.Carbonell, 11.E. Saurina, 10.G. Andía, 9.F. Silvestre, 8.Correa Llanos, 7.J.Chiapetta (C. Guillot 64'), 6.M. Cassone, 5.Perez Caffe, 4.Gómez, 3.O. Montaña, 2.A. Gutiérrez, 1.R. Grau.
 Champions: Tucumán
 Relegated: Santa Fè and Entre Rios

"Classificacion" Tournament 
Teams are divided in two pools: the winners of each, promoted to "Campeonato" tournament

Pool "C" 

Promoted: Noreste
(Rio Uruguay left tournament after 3 match)

Pool "D" 

Promoted: Alto Valle

External links 
 Memorias de la UAR 1990
  Francesco Volpe, Paolo Pacitti (Author), Rugby 2000, GTE Gruppo Editorale (1999)

Campeonato Argentino de Rugby
Argentina